Community Health Partnerships, known as CHPs (pronounced Chips) were subdivisions of Health Boards in Scotland, from 2005 to 2015, after which their functions were fully taken over by Health and Social Care Partnerships in April 2015.

CHPs had four roles within their locality:

 To deliver primary care services, including community mental health and sexual health services
 To work with social services to provide social care
 To promote health improvement
 To influence strategic planning, including the primary-secondary care interface

History 

In 2003 it was announced that CHPs would be set up as a means to devolve more power to frontline staff, and allow the NHS to work more effectively with other organisations, such as local authorities and the voluntary sector. At the time, this model was suggested as a way to better integrate health services with the council's social work department and some areas of children’s services.

The National Health Service Reform (Scotland) Act 2004 provided for each health board to set up CHPs. The legislation was not prescriptive about how the CHPs should operate or how they should be structured. The first CHPs became operational in 2005 (with CHPs in Orkney and Western Isles being set up in 2006 and 2007 respectively). 41 CHP were initially set up.

On 1 April 2007, Edinburgh North and Edinburgh South merged to become Edinburgh Community Health Partnership. On 22 March 2011, the five Glasgow City CHPs officially merged into one, although it was administered as three sectors on account of its size: North East Sector; North West Sector and South Sector.

On 1 April 2012, NHS Highland's three CHPs- North, Mid & South-East Highland - merged into a single CHP that was co-terminus with the Council area, named Highland Health and Social Care Partnership.

Because CHPs were operating as committees or sub-committees of the area Board, decisions about their funding was devolved to the NHS Boards.

In June 2011 Audit Scotland produced a report on the performance of the CHPs. The review found there was limited evidence to show CHPs had brought about widespread sustained improvements in services.

Boundaries 

CHPs were typically co-terminous with council areas and represent a district or area within one of the 14 Scottish Health Board regions. However, this is not always strictly the case.

City of Glasgow, Fife, Highland each contained several CHPs.

The two Lanarkshire CHPs are co-terminous with the North and South Lanarkshire council boundaries and, as a result, incorporated some of the population from NHS Greater Glasgow and Clyde as well as the NHS Lanarkshire catchment area. The North Lanarkshire CHP included a population of approximately 16,500 from the Chryston, Moodiesburn, Muirhead and Stepps districts of NHS Greater Glasgow and Clyde.

The South Lanarkshire CHP included a population of approximately 55,000 from the Cambuslang and Rutherglen areas of NHS Greater Glasgow and Clyde.

List of Community Health Partnerships
Note: In some areas, CHPs are known as Community Health and Care Partnerships (CHCPs).
East Ayrshire CHP
North Ayrshire CHP
South Ayrshire CHP
Scottish Borders CHCP
Dumfries and Galloway CHP
Dunfermline and West Fife CHP (Within Fife Council Area)
Glenrothes and North East Fife CHP (Within Fife Council Area)
Kirkcaldy and Levenmouth CHP (Within Fife Council Area)
Clackmannanshire CHP
Falkirk CHP
Stirling CHP
Aberdeen City CHP
Aberdeenshire CHP
Moray Community Health & Social Care Partnership (MCHSCP)
East Dunbartonshire CHP
East Renfrewshire CHCP
Glasgow City CHP - North East Sector
Glasgow City CHP - North West Sector
Glasgow City CHP - South Sector
Inverclyde CHP
Renfrewshire CHP
West Dunbartonshire CHP
Argyll and Bute CHP
Highland CHP - Mid Sector
Highland CHP - North Sector
Highland CHP - South East Sector
North Lanarkshire CHP
South Lanarkshire CHP
East Lothian CHP
Edinburgh CHP
Midlothian CHP
West Lothian CHCP
Orkney CHP
Shetland CHP
Angus CHP
Dundee CHP
Perth and Kinross CHP
Western Isles CHP

References

Further reading 
Petch, A. (2006) Health and Social Care: Establishing a Joint Future? Edinburgh, Dunedin Academic Press

External links 

 Community Health Partnerships

NHS Scotland